This is a list of airports in the Republic of Artsakh.

The majority-Armenian populated Republic of Artsakh declared independence in 1991. It is de facto independent but not diplomatically recognized by any nation and is still internationally considered a de jure part of Azerbaijan.



Airports 

Currently, no airport in the Republic of Artsakh has scheduled passenger service on commercial airlines.

See also 

 Transport in Armenia
 Transport in Azerbaijan
 List of airports in Armenia
 List of airports in Azerbaijan
 Transport in the Nagorno-Karabakh Republic

References 

  – ICAO codes and coordinates

 
 
Artsakh
Airports in Artsakh
Airports